Jalan Lanchang, Federal Route 236 (formerly Pahang State Route C118), is a federal road in Pahang, Malaysia. It is also a main route to East Coast Expressway via Lanchang Interchange.

Features

At most sections, the Federal Route 236 was built under the JKR R5 road standard, allowing maximum speed limit of up to 90 km/h.

List of junctions

References

Malaysian Federal Roads
Roads in Pahang